The Unedited box set is a 'deluxe limited edition collectors box set' by British Indie rock band Editors, released on 28 March 2011. The set covers not only the three officially released albums, The Back Room, An End Has a Start and In This Light and on This Evening but also b-sides and rarities.

The first 200 copies would receive a signed card with hand written lyrics by Tom Smith when pre-ordered in December 2010. In addition to that, the name of each person who pre-ordered the box before 16 December 2010 would be featured in the photo book as a special credit.

The box comes as a 12" presentation box, featuring:
 A 12" 100 page photo-art book
 7 CD's
 7 Heavy Weight vinyl LPs
 The full audio contents as a 320kbit/s MP3 download
The CDs and LPs are each packed in 12" book, whereas in addition the LPs are housed in individual wallets which feature new artwork for each album plus the track listing.

The In This Light and on This Evening CD album in the box also includes the live at Werchter version of No Sound But The Wind, meaning this song appears twice on the box set.

"No Sound But the Wind (Full Band Version)", "A Thousand Pieces (Instrumental)" and "Bullets (Single Version)" are not marked as such on the box. The box set contains all the original Editors songs released up to that point, although it does omit three previously released cover versions: "Orange Crush" (R.E.M.), "French Disko" (Stereolab) and "Lullaby" (The Cure).

Due to a slight manufacturing error with the colouration of the lid and the box, a brand new exterior box would be shipped out separately to everyone who ordered the box.

Track listing
All songs written by Editors.
Songs marked with an * were never released before.

For album contents see:
 The Back Room
 An End Has a Start
 In This Light and on This Evening

You Are Fading I
 "No Sound But the Wind (Full Band Version)" *
 "Last Day"
 "Heads In Bags"
 "Find Yourself A Safe Place"
 "Let Your Good Heart Lead You Home"
 "An Eye For An Eye"
 "Disappear"
 "Crawl Down The Wall"
 "For The Money"

You Are Fading II
 "Every Little Piece" *
 "Open Up"
 "Some Kind Of Spark"
 "Release"
 "Banging Heads"
 "Come Share The View"
 "The Diplomat"
 "Dust In The Sunlight"

You Are Fading III
 "This House Is Full Of Noise"
 "Camera (Original Demo)"
 "From The Outside"
 "Bullets" (Single Version)
 "Time To Slow Down"
 "A Thousand Pieces (Instrumental)" *
 "I Buried The Devil"
 "Alone"
 "A Life As A Ghost"
 "The Picture"

You Are Fading IV
 "Colours"
 "I Want A Forest"
 "Thousands Of Lovers"
 "Forest Fire"
 "Human"
 "No Sound But The Wind (Live at Rock Werchter 2010)"
 "You Are Fading"
 "These Streets Are Still Home To Me (Version 1)" *

Notes 
You Are Fading III and You Are Fading IV were made available digitally for the first time in Spring 2020.

References 

Editors (band) compilation albums
2011 compilation albums